The Omani rial (ISO 4217 code OMR) is the currency of Oman. It is divided into 1000 baisa (also written baiza).

Fixed exchange rate
From 1973 to 1986, the rial was pegged to the U.S. dollar at 1 Omani rial = US$2.895. The rate was changed in 1986 to 1 Omani rial = US$2.6008, which translates to approximately US$1 = 0.384497 rial. The Central Bank of Oman buys U.S. dollars at 0.384 Omani rial, and sells U.S. dollars at 0.386 Omani rial. It is the third-highest-valued currency unit in the world after the Kuwaiti dinar and the Bahraini dinar.

History

Until 1940, the Indian rupee and the Maria Theresa thaler (known locally as the rial due to its similar size to the Spanish eight-real coin) were the main currencies circulating in Muscat and Oman, as the state was then known, with Indian rupees circulating on the coast and thaler in the interior. Maria Theresa thaler were valued at 230 paisa, with 64 paisa = 1 rupee.

In 1940, coins were introduced for use in Dhofar, followed, in 1946, by coins for use in Oman. Both coinages were denominated in baisa (equivalent to the paisa), with 200 baisa = 1 rial. The Indian rupee and, from 1959, the Gulf rupee continued to circulate. On 6 June 1966, India devalued the Gulf rupee against the Indian rupee. Following the devaluation, several of the states still using the Gulf rupee adopted their own currencies. Oman continued to use the Gulf rupee until 1970, with the government backing the currency at its old peg to the pound, when it adopted the Saidi rial.

On 7 May 1970 the Saidi rial (named after the House of Al Said, not to be confused with Saudi riyal) was introduced as the currency of Oman to replace the Gulf rupee. It was equal to the British pound sterling and 1 Saidi rial = 21 Gulf rupees. The Saidi rial was subdivided into 1000 baisa. The Omani rial replaced the Saidi rial at par on 11 November 1972. At that time, the currency became pegged to the US dollar at 1 Omani rial = US$2.895, instead of the pound sterling, a rate that would continue until  1986, when it was devalued by about 9% to 1 Omani rial = US$2.6008. The currency name was altered due to the regime change in 1970 and the subsequent change of the country's name. Since 1975, new coins have been issued with the country's name given as Oman.

Coins

In 1940, coins were issued for use in Dhofar in denominations of 10, 20 and 50 baisa.  rial coins were added in 1948, followed by 3 baisa in 1959. In 1946, 2, 5 and 20 baisa coins were introduced for use in Oman. These were followed, between 1959 and 1960, by 3 baisa,  and 1 rial coins.

In 1970, a coinage for all of Muscat and Oman was introduced. Denominations were 2, 5, 10, 25, 50 and 100 baisa. In 1975, new coins were issued with the country's name given as Oman.  and  rial coins were introduced in 1980.

Coins currently circulating are 5, 10, 25 and 50 baisa

Coins with the value of 100 baisa and above lost their monetary value on 20 May 2020.

Banknotes
On 7 May 1970, the Sultanate of Muscat and Oman issued banknotes in denominations of 100 baisa, 1, 5 and 10 rial saidi. These were followed by notes for 100 baisa, 1, 5 and 10 Omani rials issued by the Oman Currency Board on 18 November 1972.

From 1977, the Central Bank of Oman has issued notes, with 20 and 50 rial notes introduced that, followed by 200 baisa notes in 1985.

A new series of notes was issued on 1 November 1995, and the 5-rial notes and higher were updated in 2000 with foil strips.

In 2005, a red 1 rial note commemorating the "35th National Day" was issued.

In 2010, new 5, 10, 20 and 50-rial notes were issued on the occasion of the 40th National Day. The 20-rial note is blue instead of green while the other notes are the same colour as previously.

In 2015, a purple 1 rial note commemorating the "45th National Day" was issued.

After 30 July 2019, all banknotes issued before 1 November 1995 became invalid, as well as the 5 to 50 rial banknotes issued on that date without foil strips. The 5 to 50 rial banknotes of the 1995 series with foil strips, released into circulation from 2000, remain valid. Thus, as of 2020, banknotes in circulation are mainly the 2010 series of 5 to 50 rial, the 2015 1-rial note, and the 1995 series of 100 baisa and  rial. The 1995 200-baisa note, the 1995 and 2005 1-rial notes, and the 2000 release of 5-50 rial notes are still accepted but not commonly seen. Coins in circulation are mainly 25 and 50 baisa, with 5 and 10 baisa used in shops whose pricing requires them.

A new series of banknotes has been released with sultan Haitham bin Tariq on the obverse.

See also 

 Oman
Economy of Oman
 Cooperation Council for the Arab States of the Gulf

References

External links

 Information on Omani currency (archived 25 January 2005)
 Omani Ministry of Foreign Affairs
 The banknotes of Oman 

Fixed exchange rate
Currencies of Oman
Currencies introduced in 1973